Cold Hands is an album by Boss Hogg

"Cold Hands", song by Black Lips from album Good Bad Not Evil
"Cold Hands", song by Maxwell Street Jimmy Davis
"Cold Hands", song by Suede from The Blue Hour (album)